Santo Stefano Ticino is a comune (municipality) in the Metropolitan City of Milan in the Italian region Lombardy, located about  west of Milan. 
Santo Stefano Ticino borders the following municipalities: Arluno, Ossona, Marcallo con Casone, Corbetta, and Magenta.

References

External links
 Official website

Cities and towns in Lombardy